Anfernee J'Nero Seymour (born June 24, 1995) is a Bahamian professional baseball outfielder for the Long Island Ducks of the Atlantic League of Professional Baseball. Seymour was drafted by the Miami Marlins in the 2014 Major League Baseball draft. Seymour has also represented Great Britain internationally.

Career

Miami Marlins
Seymour attended American Heritage High School in Plantation, Florida. The Miami Marlins selected Seymour in the seventh round, with the 197th overall selection, of the 2014 MLB draft.

In 2015, Seymour played for the Batavia Muckdogs of the Class A-Short Season New York-Penn League. Seymour began the 2016 season with the Greensboro Grasshoppers of the Class A South Atlantic League. While with the Grasshoppers, Seymour hit for a .252 batting average with 36 stolen bases.

Atlanta Braves
On August 6, 2016, the Marlins traded Seymour and Michael Mader to the Atlanta Braves for Hunter Cervenka. Seymour finished 2016 with the Rome Braves and ended the 2016 season batting .257 with 43 stolen bases. He started the 2017 season in Rome before a promotion to the Florida Fire Frogs in May. At the Class A Advanced level, Seymour hit .280/.341/.358 in 82 games. At the end of the 2017 minor league season, Seymour was assigned to the Peoria Javelinas. However, Seymour was suspended and removed from the team's roster before the Arizona Fall League began play. Seymour began 2018 with Florida but was released from the Braves organization on May 6, 2018.

Second stint with Marlins
On May 10, 2018, Seymour signed a minor league contract with the Miami Marlins and was assigned to the Jupiter Hammerheads. In June he was promoted to the Jacksonville Jumbo Shrimp. In 100 games between Florida, Jupiter and Jacksonville, he hit .257 with four home runs, 35 RBIs, and 24 stolen bases. He returned to Jacksonville to begin 2019. He became a free agent following the 2019 season.

Kane County Cougars
On March 3, 2021, Seymour signed with the Kane County Cougars of the American Association of Professional Baseball. Seymour would end up spending the entire 2021 season with the Cougars, during which he hit .231 with 5 Home Runs, 32 RBIs, and was second in the American Association with 37 stolen bases. On September 8, 2021, Seymour was released by the Cougars.

Charleston Dirty Birds
On February 17, 2022, Seymour signed with the Charleston Dirty Birds of the Atlantic League of Professional Baseball.

Long Island Ducks
On August 19, 2022, Seymour was traded to the Long Island Ducks of the Atlantic League of Professional Baseball.

International career
Seymour was selected to represent Great Britain at the 2023 World Baseball Classic qualification and the 2023 World Baseball Classic.

References

External links

1995 births
Living people
Bahamian expatriate baseball players in the United States
Baseball outfielders
Baseball shortstops
Batavia Muckdogs players
Florida Fire Frogs players
Greensboro Grasshoppers players
Gulf Coast Marlins players
Jacksonville Jumbo Shrimp players
Jupiter Hammerheads players
Rome Braves players
Sportspeople from Nassau, Bahamas
Great Britain
Great Britain national baseball team players
2023 World Baseball Classic players